The 2016 Cedar Rapids Titans season was the team's fifth season as a professional indoor football franchise and fifth in the Indoor Football League (IFL). One of ten teams that competed in the IFL for the 2016 season, the Titans were members of the United Conference.

Led by head coach Mark Stoute, the Titans played their home games at the U.S. Cellular Center in downtown Cedar Rapids, Iowa.

Schedule 
Key:

Pre-season

Regular season 
All start times are local time

Standings

Postseason

Roster

References

External links 
 
 Cedar Rapids Titans official statistics 
 Cedar Rapids Titans at The Gazette

Cedar Rapids
Cedar Rapids River Kings
Cedar Rapids Titans